Gediminas Orelik (born 14 May 1990) is a Lithuanian professional basketball player for Lietkabelis Panevėžys of the Lithuanian Basketball League (LKL) and the EuroCup. He primarily plays at power forward position.

Professional career
At the conclusion of the Lithuanian League's 2012–13 season, Orelik won the league's season MVP award, after averaging 17.1 points per game, 5.4 rebounds per game, and 21.2 efficiency points per game. On 17 May 2013, it was announced that Orelik signed with Lietuvos rytas Vilnius. 

On 1 August 2016, Orelik signed with Banvit of the Turkish Basketbol Süper Ligi (BSL).

On 15 July 2017, Orelik signed with Reyer Venezia Mestre of the Lega Basket Serie A (LBA), for the 2017–18 season. He averaged 
14.9 points, 4.8 rebounds and 2.9 assists in the LBA, along with 14.2 points, 5.2 rebounds and 3.5 assists in the Champions League, before suffering a season-ending knee injury in January 2018.

On 14 October 2020, Orelik signed with BC Šiauliai of the Lithuanian Basketball League (LKL).

On 11 July 2021, Orelik signed a one-year contract with Lietkabelis Panevėžys of the Lithuanian Basketball League (LKL) and the EuroCup. He averaged 15.4 points, 4.7 rebounds, 2.7 assists and 1.0 steals in 15 EuroCup games played.

On 29 July 2022, Orelik signed with Beşiktaş of the Basketbol Süper Ligi (BSL). On 16 January 2023, he left the club on a mutual agreement.
On the same day, he returned to Lietkabelis Panevėžys, signing until the end of the season.

National team career

Lithuanian junior national team
Orelik was a part of the Lithuanian Under-16, Under-18, Under-19, and Under-20 junior national teams. In 2009, he played alongside Donatas Motiejūnas, and led Lithuania to a 9th-place finish at the Under-19 World Cup. In 2011, he won a bronze medal, while representing Lithuania at the 2011 Summer Universiade.

Lithuanian senior national team
In 2015, Orelik was included into the senior Lithuanian national team's extended candidates list. However, he was not invited into the team's training camp later on.

Personal life
Orelik is of Belarusian and Polish descent.

References

External links
Eurobasket.com profile
EuroCup profile
RealGM profile
TBLStat.net profile

1990 births
Living people
Bandırma B.İ.K. players
BC Lietkabelis players
BC Prienai players
BC Rytas players
BC Šiauliai players
Beşiktaş men's basketball players
Lega Basket Serie A players
Lithuanian men's basketball players
Lithuanian people of Belarusian descent
Lithuanian people of Polish descent
Medalists at the 2011 Summer Universiade
OKK Spars players
Power forwards (basketball)
Reyer Venezia players
Small forwards
Universiade bronze medalists for Lithuania
Universiade medalists in basketball